Lucas Januario Sinoia (born 22 March 1966) is a Mozambican former boxer. He competed at the 1988 Summer Olympics and the 1996 Summer Olympics.

References

External links
 

1966 births
Living people
Mozambican male boxers
Olympic boxers of Mozambique
Boxers at the 1988 Summer Olympics
Boxers at the 1996 Summer Olympics
Place of birth missing (living people)
Welterweight boxers